Shi Yihong (born 7 June 1972), known as Shi Min before 2002, is a Chinese Peking opera singer-actress who plays Dan roles. A Plum Blossom Prize winner, Shi Yihong is considered a Peking opera superstar who not only excels in both vocal and acrobatic roles, but is always experimenting and expanding her repertoire despite resistance from conservative elements. Shi Yihong is a member of the Shanghai Jingju Theatre Company, but she also established her own production company in 2016.

Some of Shi Yihong's best known roles include: Consort Yu (from The Hegemon-King Bids His Concubine Farewell), Yang Yuhuan, Mu Guiying, Kou Zhu, Li Qingzhao, Lady Mi, Esmeralda (from The Hunchback of Notre-Dame), Wang Zhaojun, Madame White Snake, Xiao Guiying (from The Qing Ding Pearl), Duchess Zhuang (from Zhang Yimou's You and Me), Du Liniang, and countless others. She has also acted in Kunqu productions. In 1999, Shi Yihong starred in Tan Dun's The Gate, an orchestral theatre which debuted in Tokyo, Japan.

In 2018, Yihong Theatre opened in Baoshan District, Shanghai. This is the first theatre in Shanghai named after an opera artist.

Filmography

Peking opera films and TV series
Shi Yihong starred in some Peking opera films and TV series based on stage productions, such as Exchanging a Leopard Cat for a Prince (1998 TV series), Farewell My Concubine (2014 film), and Li Qingzhao (2017 film).

Non-opera films and TV series

Reality shows
2008: Let's Shake It (舞林大会) on Dragon Television

References

1972 births
Living people
Singers from Shanghai
Chinese Peking opera actresses
Actresses from Shanghai
21st-century Chinese actresses
Chinese film actresses
Chinese television actresses
20th-century Chinese actresses
National Academy of Chinese Theatre Arts alumni
20th-century Chinese women singers
21st-century Chinese women singers
Affiliated Chinese Opera School of Shanghai Theatre Academy alumni